The White House deputy chief of staff is officially the top aide to the White House chief of staff, who is the senior aide to the president of the United States. The deputy chief of staff usually has an office in the West Wing and is responsible for ensuring the smooth running of the White House bureaucracy, as well as such other duties as the chief of staff assigns to them. In all recent administrations, there have been multiple deputy chiefs with different duties.

In the Biden administration, there are three current deputy chiefs of staff:
Jen O'Malley Dillon, Deputy Chief of Staff
Bruce Reed, Deputy Chief of Staff
Natalie Quillian, Deputy Chief of Staff

Six deputy chiefs of staff were subsequently promoted to become chief of staff: Dick Cheney, Ken Duberstein, Andrew Card, Erskine Bowles, John Podesta, and Joshua Bolten.

List of White House Deputy Chiefs of Staff

 Ford administration
 Dick Cheney, Deputy Chief of Staff
 Carter administration
 Landon Butler, Deputy Chief of Staff
 William G. Simpson, Deputy Chief of Staff
 Reagan administration
 Michael Deaver, Deputy Chief of Staff, 1981–1985
 Kenneth Duberstein, Deputy Chief of Staff, 1987–1988
 M. B. Oglesby Jr., Deputy Chief of Staff, 1988–1989
 George H. W. Bush administration
 Andrew Card, Deputy Chief of Staff, 1989–1992
 Henson Moore, Deputy Chief of Staff, 1992
 Robert Zoellick, Deputy Chief of Staff, 1992–1993
 Clinton administration
 Deputy Chief of Staff for Operations
 Philip Lader, 1993–1994
 Erskine Bowles, 1994–1996
 Evelyn S. Lieberman, 1996
 John Podesta, 1997–1998
 Steve Ricchetti, 1998–2001
 Deputy Chief of Staff for Policy
 Mark Gearan, 1993
 Roy Neel, 1993
 Harold M. Ickes, 1993–1996
 Sylvia Mathews Burwell, 1997–1998
 Maria Echaveste, 1998–2001
 George W. Bush administration
 Deputy Chief of Staff for Operations
 Joe Hagin, 2001–2008
 Blake Gottesman, 2008–2009
 Deputy Chief of Staff for Policy
 Joshua Bolten, 2001–2003
 Harriet Miers, 2003–2005
 Karl Rove, 2005–2007
 Joel Kaplan, 2006–2009
 Obama administration
 Deputy Chief of Staff for Operations
 Jim Messina, 2009–2011
 Alyssa Mastromonaco, 2011–2014
 Anita Decker Breckenridge, 2014–2017
 Deputy Chief of Staff for Policy
 Mona Sutphen, 2009–2011
 Nancy-Ann DeParle, 2011–2013
 Rob Nabors, 2013–2015
 Deputy Chief of Staff for Planning
 Mark B. Childress, 2012–2014
 Deputy Chief of Staff for Policy Implementation
 Kristie Canegallo, 2014–2017
 Trump administration
 Principal Deputy Chief of Staff
Katie Walsh, 2017 (Implementation)
 Kirstjen Nielsen, 2017
 Jim Carroll, 2017–2018
 Zachary Fuentes, 2018–2019
 Emma Doyle, 2019–2020
 Deputy Chief of Staff for Operations
 Joe Hagin, 2017–2018
 Dan Walsh, 2018–2019
 Anthony M. Ornato, 2019–2021
 Deputy Chief of Staff for Policy
 Rick Dearborn, 2017–2018
 Chris Liddell, 2018–2021
 Deputy Chief of Staff for Communications
Bill Shine, 2018–2019
Dan Scavino, 2020–2021
 Biden administration
 Jen O'Malley Dillon, 2021–present
 Bruce Reed, 2021–present
 Natalie Quillian, 2023-present

In popular culture
 In the NBC television drama The West Wing, the position of White House deputy chief of staff (for strategic planning) was held by Josh Lyman in the fictional Bartlet administration and Sam Seaborn in the fictional Santos administration.
Chad Lowe portrayed White House deputy chief of staff Reed Pollock, serving under White House chief of staff Tom Lennox and President Wayne Palmer on the television drama 24.
 Adan Canto portrayed the White House deputy chief of staff before being promoted to White House chief of staff in the ABC political drama series Designated Survivor.

Notes

 
United States presidential advisors